Liang Chen and Zhang Shuai were the defending champions, but chose not to participate this year.

Tímea Babos and Kristina Mladenovic won the title, defeating Alexa Guarachi and Sabrina Santamaria in the final, 6–1, 6–0.

Seeds

Draw

Draw

References

 Main Draw

Istanbul Cup - Doubles
2019 Doubles
2019 in Istanbul
2019 in Turkish tennis
İstanbul Cup